In The Trees is the second studio album by Canadian rock band The Watchmen. It was the first album to be released with Ken Tizzard on bass, who joined the band in 1994 when Pete Loewen left. With hit singles "Boneyard Tree", "All Uncovered", and "Lusitana", this was the band's breakthrough release in their home country of Canada. Videos for both "Boneyard Tree" and "All Uncovered" received heavy play on MuchMusic. At this time, singer Daniel Greaves began to become more comfortable with his songwriting ability. Because of this, only three of the album's songs were credited to guitarist Joey Serlin.

Commercial performance
The album was certified Platinum in Canada by the Canadian Recording Industry Association on May 31, 1995. To date, this is the band's only Platinum album in Canada. By March 1996, the album had sold 150,000 copies in Canada.

Track listing

Personnel
Adapted credits from the liner notes of In the Trees.
The Watchmen
Ken Tizzard - Bass
Joey Serlin - Guitar, Vocals
Sammy Kohn - Drums, Percussion, Vocals
Daniel Greaves - Vocals, Piano, Harp

Additional musician
Mary Gaines - Cello on "All Uncovered"

Production
Mr. Colson - Producer, Engineer
Assisted by Mark Peters and Mike Zirkel
Recorded at Metal Works Studios, Mississauga, ON
Additional recording at Smart Studios, Madison, WI
Mixed at Smart Studios by Mr. Colson
Mastered by Bob Ludwig at Gateway Mastering, Portland, ME

References

External links
The Watchmen Bio
Watchmen Singer Becomes Doctor
Keep An Eye On Those Watchmen

1994 albums
The Watchmen (band) albums
MCA Records albums
Albums recorded at Metalworks Studios